Thitsar Ni (born 1946 in Rangoon) is a Burmese poet and writer, known for spearheading post-modern Burmese poetry since the 1970s. He has published more than 30 books under several pen names, spanning genres including poetry, short stories, literary criticism, science fiction, and religion, philosophy, and world politics. In 2011, he founded a social welfare organization,  (ကုသလပရဟိတ), with singer Ratha. After witnessing the Hlaingthaya massacre in March 2021, he wrote a poem, "Hlaingthaya," which was published in a 2022 poetry anthology, Picking off new shoots will not stop the spring. Thitsar Ni is a Buddhist.

Works 

 The Time for Fetching Water (1965)
 Myinsaing Archery (1978)
 Walking Out of My Own Skin
 Redundant Sentences
 21st Album

Notes 

1946 births
Burmese writers
Burmese male poets
20th-century Burmese poets
20th-century male writers
21st-century Burmese poets
21st-century male writers
People from Yangon
Living people